Don't Tell The Bride (Ireland) is an Irish version of reality TV programme Don't Tell The Bride, it has aired on RTÉ Two since 2010.

Format
The show's format consists of a couple who are given  to spend on their wedding but they must spend three weeks apart without contact, and the bridegroom must organise every aspect of the event and attire to surprise the bride, including the wedding dress, and the hen and stag parties. A full second series was aired in 2012, a third started on RTÉ 2 in January 2013, and a fourth started on RTÉ 2 on 16 January 2014 with Waterford couple Natasha Hosey and Eddie Kiely.

References

External links
RTE Website

2010 Irish television series debuts
RTÉ original programming
Wedding television shows